This is a list of animated television series first aired in 2011.

See also 
 List of animated feature films of 2011
 List of Japanese animation television series of 2011

References

Television series
Animated series
2011
2011
2011-related lists